Robert "Bob" Rita (born October 2, 1969) is a Democratic member of the Illinois House of Representatives for the 28th District since January 8, 2003. Rita is also the Calumet Township Democratic committeeman and a trustee on the township board. His state representative district includes parts of Chicago's 9th and 34th wards, as well as several suburbs. Rita lists economic redevelopment, equitable school funding and increased health care availability as his top priorities in the state legislature. Rita is an Operating Engineer and a member of Local #150.

Rita has been re-elected four times, and was unopposed in the 2008 general election. His opponent in the February 5, 2008 Democratic primary, Earick Rayburn, was backed by William Dugan - then-head of Operating Engineers Union Local 150. The union contributed nearly $100,000 to Rayburn's campaign. Rita defeated Rayburn by a margin of more than 3-to-1 in the primary, and received about 60% of the vote in a five candidate race.

As of July 3, 2022, Representative Rita is a member of the following Illinois House committees:

 Cities & Villages Committee (HCIV)
 Cybersecurity, Data Analytics, & IT Committee (HCDA)
 Ethics & Elections Committee (SHEE)
 (Chairman of) Executive Committee (HEXC)
 Prescription Drug Affordability Committee (HPDA)
 Revenue & Finance Committee (HREF)
 (Chairman of) Sales, Amusements, and Other Taxes Subcommittee (HREF-SATX)

Electoral history

References

External links
Representative Robert Rita (D) 28th District at the Illinois General Assembly
98th, 97th, 96th, 95th, 94th, 93rd
 
Robert Rita at Illinois House Democrats

Democratic Party members of the Illinois House of Representatives
1969 births
Living people
People from Blue Island, Illinois
People from Oak Lawn, Illinois
21st-century American politicians